New Creek Mountain is a mountain ridge of the Ridge-and-Valley Appalachians in Grant and Mineral counties in the U.S. state of West Virginia. The mountain is named for New Creek which rises and flows along its western flanks.  It is part of the Wills Mountain Anticline, with Knobly Mountain along its eastern flank.  The Allegheny Front rises steeply to the west of New Creek Mountain. Oriskany (Ridgeley) sandstone cliffs ring the entire mountain.

Saddle Mountain, prominent in the view eastward from the Skyland Overlook on U.S. 50, is a saddle-shaped dip in the mountain's ridgecrest.

References

External links 
 
 

Landforms of Grant County, West Virginia
Landforms of Mineral County, West Virginia
Ridges of West Virginia